The Firm is a 1993 American legal crime thriller film directed and co-produced by Sydney Pollack and starring Tom Cruise with Jeanne Tripplehorn, Gene Hackman, Ed Harris, Holly Hunter, Hal Holbrook, David Strathairn and Gary Busey. The film is based on the 1991 novel The Firm by author John Grisham. The Firm was one of two films released in 1993 that were adapted from a Grisham novel, the other being The Pelican Brief.

Released on June 30, 1993, the film was a major commercial success, grossing $270.2 million against a budget of $42 million, making it the highest grossing film adapted from a Grisham novel and the highest-grossing R-rated film of 1993, and received positive reviews for the performances (particularly from Cruise and Hunter), although the screenplay received some criticism. Holly Hunter was nominated for the Academy Award for Best Supporting Actress for her performance, while Dave Grusin was nominated for Best Original Score.

Plot
Mitch McDeere, a top Harvard Law School graduate, takes a tempting job offer from boutique law firm Bendini, Lambert & Locke in Memphis, Tennessee. He and his wife Abby relocate there, and he prepares to pass the Tennessee bar exam. Senior partner Avery Tolar shows Mitch the firm's strict culture of loyalty, confidentiality, and high fees. Although the money and benefits, such as a new house, a Mercedes-Benz, and paid-off student loans, tempt Mitch, Abby is wary of the firm's meddling in employees' personal lives.

After passing the bar exam, Mitch works grueling hours and strains his marriage. With Avery's guidance, Mitch discovers the firm's primary work involves aiding wealthy clients to hide money in offshore shell corporations and other questionable tax-avoidance schemes. On a work trip to the Cayman Islands, Mitch overhears a client saying that the firm's Chicago associates break legs. At Avery's vacation home, he finds documents linked to four deceased associates. Meanwhile, a prostitute arranged by the firm's security chief, Bill DeVasher, seduces Mitch, and the photos are used to blackmail him into silence. Mitch hires private investigator Eddie Lomax to investigate the associates' deaths, but Lomax is murdered by hitmen, witnessed by his secretary Tammy.

FBI agents reveal to Mitch that BL&L's top client is the Morolto crime family of the Chicago Outfit, and most of the firm is involved in a significant tax fraud and money laundering scheme. The deceased associates learned the truth and were killed, as was Lomax. The FBI warns Mitch that his belongings are bugged and pressures him to provide evidence against the firm and the Moroltos. In return for $1.5 million and his brother Ray's release from prison, Mitch agrees to cooperate. The FBI releases Ray and gives Mitch half the money, but plans to return Ray to jail after Mitch hands over the incriminating files. Mitch confesses his one-night stand in the Caymans to Abby, who plans to leave him.

Mitch discovers that the firm's practice of sending padded bills to clients is mail fraud, exposing them to RICO charges. With Tammy's help, he copies the billing records but needs files from Avery's Cayman house. Avery changes his schedule, jeopardizing Mitch's plan, but Abby flies to the Caymans and seduces and drugs Avery to get the files. The firm's phone tap records Abby warning Tammy, leading DeVasher's hitmen to pursue them. After copying the files, Avery tells Abby the firm set up the prostitute who seduced Mitch on the beach. Avery warns Abby to leave and is later killed by DeVasher's hitmen. They stage his death as a bathtub drowning.

Mitch's plans are compromised when a prison guard on the Moroltos' payroll tips off DeVasher about Ray's transfer to FBI custody. Fleeing from DeVasher and his hitman, Mitch confronts DeVasher and knocks him unconscious. Mitch meets with the Moroltos, presenting himself as a loyal attorney who uncovered the firm's illegal over-billing. He asks for permission to turn over their billing invoices to help the FBI prosecute the firm, but assures them that any information he has about their legal affairs is safe under attorney–client privilege. The Moroltos reluctantly agree to guarantee Mitch's safety. Mitch hands over the evidence and is able to continue his legal career. He reconciles with Abby.

Mitch's decision to work with the Moroltos angers the FBI, but he reminds them that the evidence he has provided is under RICO's jurisdiction and can ensure that the senior members of the firm go to prison for a long time. The film ends with the McDeeres returning to Boston in their old car and Ray enjoying his new life in the Caymans with the money Mitch obtained for him.

Cast

 Tom Cruise as Mitch McDeere, a promising recent Harvard Law graduate
 Jeanne Tripplehorn as Abby McDeere, Mitch's wife
 Gene Hackman as Avery Tolar, Mitch's mentor at the Firm
 Holly Hunter as Tammy Hemphill, Eddie's chain-smoking secretary and lover who aids Mitch in copying and stealing the files in Memphis and the Cayman Islands
 Ed Harris as FBI Agent Wayne Tarrance, the agent in charge of the investigation into the Firm; Mitch's primary contact with the FBI
 Hal Holbrook as Oliver Lambert, senior partner at the Firm
 Jerry Hardin as Royce McKnight, managing partner at the Firm
 David Strathairn as Ray McDeere, Mitch's brother who was in jail for a manslaughter conviction
 Terry Kinney as Lamar Quinn, Mitch's friend who works at the Firm
 Wilford Brimley as Bill DeVasher, officially the head of security at the Firm—unofficially the Firm's main hitman
 Sullivan Walker as Thomas Abanks, the owner of a scuba diving business
 Gary Busey as Eddie Lomax, a private investigator and former cell-mate of Ray McDeere
 Barbara Garrick as Kay Quinn, Lamar Quinn's wife who befriends both Abby and Mitch
 Steven Hill as FBI Director Denton Voyles
 Margo Martindale as Nina Huff, Mitch's Secretary
 Paul Sorvino as Tony Morolto
 Joe Viterelli as Joey Morolto
 Jerry Weintraub as Sonny Capps
 Tobin Bell as The Nordic Man, Morolto Hitman
 Dean Norris as The Squat Man, Morolto Hitman
 Karina Lombard as Young Woman on Beach who seduces Mitch
 John Beal as Nathan Locke
 Paul Calderon as Thomas Richie

Production
Principal photography took place from November 9, 1992 to March 20, 1993 and though it was primarily filmed in Memphis, Tennessee, some scenes were filmed in Marion, Arkansas and the Cayman Islands.

The film's soundtrack is almost exclusively solo piano by Dave Grusin.

Gene Hackman's name did not appear on the film's release poster. Hackman joined the film late, when it was already well into production, because the producers had originally wanted to change the gender of the character and cast Meryl Streep, until author John Grisham objected and Hackman was eventually cast. Tom Cruise's deal with Paramount already stated that only his name could appear above the title. Hackman also wanted his name to appear above the title, but when this was refused he asked for his name to be removed completely from the poster. Hackman's name does appear in the beginning or end credits.

This is also the final film for Steven Hill and John Beal.

Differences from the novel

The film accords with the book in most respects, but the ending is significantly different. Mitch does not end up in the Caribbean, as in the book; he and Abby simply get into their car and drive back to Boston.

A more fundamental difference from the book is the motives and manner in which Mitch solves his predicament. In the book, Mitch acknowledges to himself that he is breaking the attorney–client privilege by copying information and giving it to the FBI. In most US states this privilege only applies to crimes that have already been committed. The privilege does not apply if a lawyer knows that his client either is committing or will commit a crime.  However, it is important to note that the attorney-client privilege is one of an evidentiary nature relating specifically to information sought during pretrial discovery or at trial.  This is distinguished from an attorney's duty of confidentiality, which prohibits (with exceptions including, for example, if a client is engaged in conduct that will certainly lead to physical harm against another) disclosure of communications made between the attorney and client.  Additionally, Mitch must disclose information about his legitimate clients as well.  Accepting that he will likely not be allowed to practice law anywhere again, he swindles $10 million from the firm, along with receiving $1 million of a promised $2 million from the FBI for his cooperation. After an extended manhunt involving the police, the firm's lawyers, and hired thugs from the Morolto family, Mitch escapes with Abby (and his brother Ray) to the Cayman Islands.  Before fleeing, he leaves behind detailed records of the firm's illegal activities, as well as a recorded deposition.  Mitch's information gives federal prosecutors enough evidence to indict half of the firm's active lawyers right away, as well as several retired partners.  The documents also provide the FBI with circumstantial evidence of the firm's involvement in money laundering and tax fraud, and thus probable cause for a search warrant for the firm's building and files.  This additional evidence is enough to smash both the firm and the Morolto family with a massive RICO indictment.

In the film, apparently in order to preserve the protagonist's personal integrity, Mitch exposes a systematic overbilling scheme by the firm, thus driving a wedge between the Moroltos (who in essence become complicit with Mitch) and their law firm (in the book, overbilling only received a brief mention). He receives a smaller amount of money from the FBI, which he gives to Ray, allowing him to disappear.  Rather than capitalizing on his circumstances by stealing money from the firm, as in the book, the movie's McDeere ends up battered and bruised, but with his integrity and professional ethics intact. Mitch also makes the FBI have to work in order to bring down the firm by having to argue that each instance of excessive billing is a federal offense (by virtue of the excessive bills being sent through the mail).  The volume and frequency meet the criteria for RICO, thereby enabling the FBI to effectively put the firm out of business by seizing its property and equipment and freezing its bank accounts. From here the Moroltos would then need to find another law firm willing to take them on as clients, and if they couldn't, charges for non-lodgment of tax returns could be brought.  Since Mitch is exposing only illegal activity, he is able to retain his law license.

Avery Tolar was originally Avery Tolleson; the latest version of the novel uses the film's surname. Tolar is portrayed as a sort of reluctant villain in the film, while in the novel he has no such moral conflicts.

Mitch's confession to Abby about his sexual infidelity was also unique to the film. In the novel, McDeere never tells Abby about his infidelity. In the book, Abby's not knowing about Mitch's infidelity is a major "suspense" piece. Mitch comes home one evening and finds an envelope addressed to Abby, that has "Photos – Do Not Bend" written on it. The photos were surreptitiously given to DeVasher by Art Germain. Mitch thinks it is the pictures he was shown of his infidelity overseas. Abby is in the bedroom when he sees the open package. He enters the bedroom and learns that Abby opened the package, but it was empty. Mitch realizes DeVasher is toying with him, and this incident in the book causes Mitch to cooperate with the FBI.  In the film, Mitch's confession prompts Abby to seriously consider leaving him, but she ultimately helps him bring down the firm.

Also, in the book, Eddie's old secretary, Tammy, seduces and drugs Avery.  In the movie, however, it is Abby who seduces Avery.  This also changes the character development because in the movie Abby is portrayed as risking herself for Mitch. In the book, Abby is simply an accomplice to Tammy.

Release
The film was released while Grisham was at the height of his popularity. That week, Grisham and Michael Crichton evenly divided the top six paperback spots on The New York Times Best Seller list. It opened on June 30, 1993 in 2,393 theatres, and landed at #1 at the box office, grossing $25.4 million over the 4th of July weekend. It remained in the #1 spot at the box office for 3 weeks. After 12 weeks in theatres, the film was a huge success, making over $158 million domestically and $111 million internationally ($270 million worldwide). Additionally, it was the largest grossing R-rated movie of 1993 and of any film based on a Grisham novel.

Awards
The film earned two Academy Award nominations including Best Supporting Actress for Holly Hunter (losing to Anna Paquin for The Piano, though she did win an Oscar at that year's ceremony for Best Actress in the same film as Paquin) and Best Original Score for Dave Grusin (losing to John Williams for Schindler's List).

Reception
On Rotten Tomatoes the film holds an approval rating of 76% based on 58 reviews, with an average of 6.20/10. The site's critics consensus states: "The Firm is a big studio thriller that amusingly tears apart the last of 1980s boardroom culture and the false securities it represented."  Audiences polled by CinemaScore gave the film an average grade of "B+" on an A+ to F scale.

Roger Ebert gave The Firm three stars out of four, remarking: "The movie is virtually an anthology of good small character performances. [...] The large gallery of characters makes The Firm into a convincing canvas [... but] with a screenplay that developed the story more clearly, this might have been a superior movie, instead of just a good one with some fine performances."

The film earned some negative reviews as well, notably from James Berardinelli, who said that "[v]ery little of what made the written version so enjoyable has been successfully translated to the screen, and what we're left with instead is an overly-long [and] pedantic thriller." Grisham enjoyed the film, remarking: "I thought [Tom Cruise] did a good job. He played the innocent young associate very well."

Home media
The film was released on VHS in December 1993, with the cassettes were specially made of blue plastic. The DVD was released on May 23, 2000. The special features include only the teaser and theatrical trailers. A Blu-ray edition was released on September 11, 2012.

In other media

TV sequel

In April 2011 Entertainment One announced that a sequel to The Firm was being produced with Sony Pictures Television and Paramount Pictures. The series picked up the story of Mitch and his family ten years after the events of the novel and film. The first season was 22 episodes long and began production in Canada in July 2011. In May 2011, NBC confirmed that they had acquired the U.S. broadcast rights to the show and that they planned to début it in January 2012. The show was cancelled after its first season.

References

External links

 
 
 
 
 
 "The Firm: Blu-ray Review" at HD-Report

1993 films
1993 crime thriller films
1990s legal films
American crime thriller films
American legal films
Davis Entertainment films
Films about the Federal Bureau of Investigation
Films scored by Dave Grusin
Films about lawyers
Films adapted into television shows
Films based on works by John Grisham
Films directed by Sydney Pollack
Films produced by John Davis
Films produced by Scott Rudin
Films produced by Sydney Pollack
Films set in Harvard University
Films set in Massachusetts
Films set in Memphis, Tennessee
Films set in Arkansas
Films shot in Arkansas
Films shot in Massachusetts
Films shot in Tennessee
Films shot in the Cayman Islands
Legal thriller films
Paramount Pictures films
Films with screenplays by Robert Towne
Films based on thriller novels
1990s English-language films
1990s American films